"The Wig Master" is the 129th episode of the NBC situation comedy Seinfeld. This is the 19th episode for the seventh season, originally airing on April 4, 1996. The episode follows the mishaps which befall George and Kramer as a result of their parking at a discount parking lot, while Jerry feels emasculated by Elaine's new boyfriend, who holds out the promise of a discount on a designer dress in order to keep her going out with him.

Plot
When Jerry leaves an upscale clothing store without making a purchase, he feels guilty and claims he will return with a friend to get their opinion of a jacket he doesn't like. The sales clerk Craig Stewart, who sports a long ponytail, looks skeptical. Jerry returns with Elaine just to prove Craig wrong. Craig flirts with Elaine in front of Jerry, making him feel emasculated. Moreover, Elaine strongly endorses the jacket, thereby pressuring Jerry into buying it. Craig promises Elaine a discount on a Nicole Miller dress, but claims it sold out immediately after and is being restocked.

George and Kramer begin parking at a discount parking lot. After picking up his car George discovers a condom inside and suspects prostitutes are servicing their clients inside the cars. The lot loses Kramer's keys, forcing him to use another customer's Mary Kay pink Cadillac Eldorado and sleep in Jerry's apartment. George questions the prostitutes hanging around. He offers one of them money for information, but is caught by Susan. Susan has no trouble believing him when he explains, to his frustration since he was hoping she might call off their wedding due to his seeming infidelity. The lot refuses to refund George's money, denying the prostitution allegations, and says George cannot reclaim his car for several days because it is parked in the back.

George and Susan have a houseguest, Susan's friend Ethan, who is the "Wig Master" for a production of Joseph and the Amazing Technicolor Dreamcoat. Ethan's co-worker, the show's costume designer, lends Kramer the technicolor dreamcoat. Wearing the coat, a woman's large hat blown off by the wind, and a silver-handled walking stick Elaine gave him after writing about it for the Peterman catalogue, Kramer goes to pick up the Cadillac. He finds a prostitute servicing a client in the car. When he ejects them, she starts attacking him over the fee he has cost her. Police arrive and assume Kramer to be a pimp due to his attire and fight with a prostitute. They arrest him.

Fuming about Craig's slight toward him, Jerry unsuccessfully attempts to return his jacket in order to deny Craig the sales commission. When Jerry is lunching with Ethan, a friend of Ethan's stops by and sets up a get-together with him; Jerry demands to know why he assumed he and Ethan were not together.

Jerry suspects Craig is just promising the discount on the dress in order to keep seeing Elaine. She doesn't believe it, especially when Craig promises the same discount to a male friend. When Elaine is over at Craig's apartment, his manager calls; she confirms from him that the dress has been in stock all along. In revenge, Elaine cuts off Craig's ponytail to sell for wig hair.

Production
The episode was inspired by the time writer Spike Feresten's live-in girlfriend had her wig master friend as a house guest. Feresten recalled, "He ended up staying for two days, and I made his life a living hell. And he left." Feresten also once took his car to a discount parking lot. His car door wouldn't lock, and when he picked it up he found discarded condoms inside; it turned out that prostitutes had been operating in the car.

The cafe scenes were filmed outside the CBS Studio Center commissary on February 27, 1996. At the beginning of the second one Ethan was scripted to be talking about George and Susan: "How could you love a guy like George? He's a mess." Actor Patrick Bristow said "like that" instead of "like George", making the line more ambiguous. Filming of the parking lot scenes on the same day was plagued by rain, and they were re-shot on March 19.

The ending of George's story was cut; in deleted footage Susan doesn't believe him when he tells her that the parking lot owners wouldn't let him take his car, and George unsuccessfully tries to turn her mistrust into a breakup. In another cut scene Jerry, at Kramer's suggestion, goes around town gauging people's reactions to the crest on his jacket, only to bump into Kenny Bania wearing the same jacket.

In the legal world
The clothing store's policy of not allowing purchases to be returned for the sake of denying a sales clerk his commission was cited in Clancy v. King (Maryland Court of Appeals, No. 112, 26 August 2008).

References

External links

Seinfeld (season 7) episodes
1996 American television episodes